W. G. Grace played mostly for Gloucestershire County Cricket Club and Marylebone Cricket Club (MCC) during the four seasons from 1883 to 1886. He also represented England and shared his highest Test partnership in 1886, the same season in which he achieved his career-best bowling analysis.

1883 English cricket season

Grace made 22 first-class appearances in 1883, scoring 1,352 runs, with a highest score of 112, at an average of 34.66 with 1 century and 9 half-centuries. In the field, he took 35 catches and 94 wickets with a best analysis of 7–92. His bowling average was 22.09; he had 5 wickets in an innings 9 times and 10 wickets in a match 4 times.

1884 English cricket season

Grace made 26 first-class appearances in 1884, scoring 1,361 runs, with a highest score of 116 not out, at an average of 34.02 with 3 centuries and 6 half-centuries. In the field, he took 30 catches and 82 wickets with a best analysis of 6–72. His bowling average was 21.48; he had 5 wickets in an innings 5 times.

1885 English cricket season

Grace made 25 first-class appearances in 1885, scoring 1,688 runs, with a highest score of 221 not out, at an average of 43.28 with 4 centuries and 10 half-centuries. In the field, he took 31 catches and 117 wickets with a best analysis of 9–20. His bowling average was 18.79; he had 5 wickets in an innings 8 times and 10 wickets in a match twice.

1886 English cricket season

Grace achieved his career-best bowling analysis of 10/49 when playing for MCC against Oxford University at The Parks in 1886; and he scored 104 in his only innings to complete a rare "match double".  1886 was the last time he took 100 wickets in a season.

The highest Test wicket partnership involving Grace was at The Oval in 1886 when he and William Scotton scored 170 for the first wicket against Australia.  Grace's own score was also 170 and was the highest in his Test career.

Grace made 33 first-class appearances in 1886, scoring 1,846 runs, with a highest score of 170, at an average of 35.50 with 4 centuries and 9 half-centuries. In the field, he took 36 catches and 122 wickets with a best analysis of 10–49. His bowling average was 19.99; he had 5 wickets in an innings 10 times and 10 wickets in a match once.

References

External links
 CricketArchive – W.G. Grace

Bibliography

 
 
 
 
 
 
 
 
 

English cricket seasons in the 19th century
1883